XHLDC-FM is a radio station on 90.7 FM in Magdalena de Kino, Sonora, Mexico. It is operated by Grupo Audiorama Comunicaciones and is known as KY 90.7.

History
XHLDC began as XHIMS-FM in Imuris, Sonora, with concession awarded to Radio Comunicación Creativa, S.A. de C.V., on August 16, 1994. The station came to air from Magdalena de Kino and owned by Grupo ACIR in 1997. The callsign changed that August to XHLDC-FM, in honor of assassinated presidential candidate Luis Donaldo Colosio, who was from Magdalena de Kino. The station's original format was grupera La Comadre, though it soon changed names to Stereo Sol, Fiesta Mexicana and finally to the Toño format once Larsa took control.

In the early 2000s, Grupo ACIR sold many radio stations to Radiorama, including XHLDC. Radiorama then transferred operations of many of its stations in the state to Grupo Larsa Comunicaciones in 2011. This station reverted to control of Audiorama (a related company to Radiorama) a decade later, and on October 4, 2021, the station formally relaunched as KY 90.7 using imaging debuted on Audiorama's XHDK-FM Guadalajara in 2020.

References

Radio stations in Sonora